Runabout 2 is a racing game released for the PlayStation in Japan on November 18, 1999, and in the US on May 19, 2000, and developed by Graphic Research. The object of the game is to drive from point A to B in a limited amount of time in order to pick up a certain item or deliver an item. Runabout 2 consists of 13 missions and the player must complete each mission in order to complete the game. Each stage contains many secrets and shortcuts and there are multiple routes through the missions in the game.

Reception
The game received mixed reviews from critics.

References

Racing video games
PlayStation (console) games
PlayStation (console)-only games
1999 video games
Video games developed in Japan